Gary Cooke (born 10 November 1958) is a former Australian rules footballer who played with Melbourne in the Victorian Football League (VFL).

Notes

External links 

1958 births
Living people
Australian rules footballers from Victoria (Australia)
Melbourne Football Club players
Casey Demons players